

Description 

Euchomenella heteroptera is a species of mantis, also known as the "giraffe mantis", in the family Deroplatyidae.  The females are usually larger in size compared to the males, growing to about 3.5-4 inches while the males grow roughly around 2.5-3 inches.  These mantis can come in a vary in color between brown or grey, including red or pink on their raptorials and white spots along their abdomen.  Because of their extremely slim stature. these mantises are also excellent at imitating sticks.

References

External links 

 

Insects described in 1842
Mantidae